John Gilmour may refer to:

 Sir John Gilmour of Craigmillar (16051671), Scottish judge, Lord President of the Court of Session 16611671 
 John Taylor Gilmour (18371917), Canadian physician, journalist and politician
 Sir John Gilmour, 1st Baronet (18451920), Scottish Unionist politician
 Sir John Gilmour, 2nd Baronet (18761940), Scottish Unionist politician, Home Secretary, Secretary of State for Scotland
 John Inglis Gilmour (18961928), Scottish flying ace in World War I
 John Gilmour (footballer) (19011963), Scottish footballer (Dundee FC and Scotland)
 John Gilmour (botanist) (19061986), British botanist
 Sir John Gilmour, 3rd Baronet (19122007), Scottish Conservative Party politician, Member of Parliament for East Fife 19611979
 Sir John Gilmour, 4th Baronet (19442013), Scottish nobleman
 John Gilmour (ice hockey), (born 1993)
 John Gilmour (cartoonist) (1892–1951), New Zealand cartoonist

See also 
John Gilmore (disambiguation)